The 4th Golden Rooster Award honoring the best in film of 1984, was given in Jinan, Shandong Province, June 2, 1984.

Winners and Nominees

Special Award 
Special Jury Award
Literatural Documentary: Mao Zedong
Documentary in Revolution Theme: Crossing the Chishui River Four Times
Feature: 不该发生的故事
Children Feature: The Candidate
Director: Chen Lizhou（Road）

References

External links 
 The 4th Golden Rooster Award for

1984
Golden Rooster Awards
Golden Rooster Awards
Golden Rooster Awards, 4th
Golden Rooster Awards